Bodil Ipsen (30 August 1889 – 26 November 1964) was a Danish actress and film director, and is considered one of the great stars of Danish cinematic history. Her acting career, which began in theater and silent films, was marked by leading roles in large folk comedies and melodramas. However, it was as a director that she was most influential: directing the first Danish film noir and making several dark psychological thrillers during the 1940s and 1950s. Ipsen's name along with that of Bodil Kjer is given to Denmark's most celebrated film prize, the Bodil Award.

Career
Bodil Louise Jensen Ipsen was born on 30 August 1889 in Copenhagen, Denmark. In 1908, after obtaining her high school diploma, Ipsen began studying at Det Kongelige Teater (Royal Danish Theatre) and made her stage debut there one year later. Her work on stage quickly received attention. Especially noted were her performances with Danish actor Poul Reumert. Throughout her career, Ipsen performed at the Royal Danish Theatre as well as the Dagmar Theater, The Folketeatret, and The Betty Nansen Theater. She also performed on stage in Sweden and Norway. Ipsen played almost 200 roles in the theater, the majority as lead actress, as well as 150 radio theater roles and four television parts.

In 1920, Ipsen made her film debut as a leading actress in Lavinen, directed by her third husband, Emanuel Gregers. She made films with Gregers in 1922 and 1923. Off and on, she acted in 12 films during her career. Her most noteworthy early performances were in big blustering comedies, such as the shrewish spinster Bollette in Bollettes Brudefærd or the Countess Danner in Gregers' Sørensen og Rasmussen.

Ipsen became a director in 1942 and directed 10 films in 10 years. Although Ipsen's acting talent was showcased in big romantic comedies, her seat in the director's chair marked the development of classic Danish dark dramas and mysteries. Her debut film, which she co-directed with Lau Lauritzen Jr. was the 1942 dark psychological thriller Afsporet (Derailed), the first true Danish film noir. Two years later, Ipsen directed another two even more extreme noirs, Mordets Melodi (Melody of Murder), about a singer accused of serial murders, and Besættelse (Possession), a taut thriller about a man's erotic obsession with a young woman.

After Afsporet Ipsen collaborated with Lau Lauritzen Jr. on four more films. Their second film, De røde enge (The Red Meadows), about the Nazi occupation of Denmark during World War II, received the 1946 Grand Prize at the Cannes Film Festival. In 1950, Ipsen and Lauritzen again won acclaim for their film Café Paradis (Paradise Cafe). The harsh story about alcoholism is considered a masterpiece of Danish cinema, and for which Ipsen won her namesake award, the Bodil, named after her and fellow actress, Bodil Kjer. Two years later, Ipsen and Lauritzen again won the Bodil Award for Best Danish Film for Det Sande Ansigt (The True Face). 

In 1960, at age 71, Ipsen was awarded the Bodil again, this time as Leading Actress of the Year for the film Tro, håb og trolddom. Ipsen retired afterwards. She died on 26 November 1964 in Copenhagen. The movie Bodil Ipsen og Filmen (Bodil Ipsen and the Film), released in 2006, is a portrait of her life and career.

Personal life
Ipsen's steady career on stage was offset by a volatile personal life. She was married four times. Ipsen was married the first time in 1910 with the actor Jacob Texière, but the marriage was dissolved within the same year. Then, in 1914, she married civil engineer H.H.O. Moltke, and they divorced after three years. Her marriage in 1919 with film director Emanuel Gregers lasted four years. Ipsen was married for a fourth time in 1932 to the journalist Ejnar Black. They remained together for 17 years until Black's death in 1949. After Black's death, Ipsen isolated herself outside of work, preferring the company of her assistant and housekeeper, Stella Jensen.

Filmography

Actress

Director

References

External links 
 

Danish film actresses
Danish film directors
Danish silent film actresses
20th-century Danish actresses
Danish women film directors
Best Actress Bodil Award winners
1889 births
1964 deaths
Directors of Palme d'Or winners